Tony Thomas may refer to:

 Tony Thomas (film historian) (1927-1997)
 Tony Thomas (footballer) (born 1971), English footballer with Tranmere Rovers, Everton and Motherwell
 Tony Thomas (guitarist) (aka Tony "Strat" Thomas), American funk and blues guitarist
 Tony Thomas (physicist) (born 1949), Professor of Physics at the University of Adelaide
 Tony Thomas (producer) (born 1948), American television and film producer
 Tony Thomas (rugby league), rugby league footballer of the 1960s and 1970s
 Raymond A. Thomas (also known as Tony Thomas), American general

See also
 Anthony Thomas (disambiguation)
 Antonio Thomas (disambiguation)